Sir Stig Fogh Andersen (February 24, 1950 in Hørsholm) is a Danish operatic tenor. He is considered one of the most famous Wagner-tenors, "one of the leading Siegfrieds in the world today". He is married to  Tina Kiberg, who is also an opera singer.

References

External links
Biography on Naxos.com
Artist's website

1950 births
Living people
People from Hørsholm Municipality
Danish operatic tenors
20th-century Danish male opera singers